Balzan Football Club is a Maltese football club from the village of Balzan, which currently plays in the Maltese Premier League. The Club was founded in 1937 and has played top-level football since 2010.

The club has been one of the top teams in Malta and qualified to the Europa League for five seasons in a row from 2015-16 to 2019-20. Balzan finished runners up in the Malta Premier League in the 2016–17 and 2017–18 seasons and were finalists in the 2015–16 FA Trophy Final, which they lost on penalties 5-4 to Sliema, after the game finished 0-0 after extra time. In May 2019 the Club finally won its first major honour, conquering the Maltese FA Trophy after a classic final versus Valletta which finished 4-4 after extra time, but which Balzan won 5-4 on penalties.

Players

Current First Team

Club officials and coaching staff

Club facilities
The Club's Administration Building ‘Solerville’ is located at Main Street, Balzan. A bar and garden restaurant on the ground floor are open to the public. The Club’s modern training facilities, located at Robert Mifsud Bonnici Street, Lija, include a clubhouse and a full size pitch with synthetic turf. The clubhouse includes a conference room, a bar and a gymnasium and was officially opened on 13 March 2011. From September 2015, Balzan F.C. teams also commenced training at St Aloysius' College Ground, after this ground underwent a major upgrade.

In 2019 Balzan FC started the construction of an additional 2 storey clubhouse at its Lija ground which feature additional changing room facilities, as well as accommodation for visiting teams. The building was completed in late 2021.

.

Honours

Maltese FA Trophy
Winners: 2018–19
Maltese Second Division
Winners: 2008–09

.

European record

Matches

Notes
 1Q: First qualifying round
 2Q: Second qualifying round

Managerial history

References

External links

Official website

 
Football clubs in Malta
Association football clubs established in 1937